Tulbaghia aequinoctialis is a plant in the family Amaryllidaceae native to Angola.  It was first described to science in 1878.

Notes

References
Tulbaghia aequinoctialis at Global Species
Biodiversity Heritage Library
Catalogue of Life

Allioideae
Flora of Angola
Plants described in 1878
Taxa named by John Gilbert Baker
Taxa named by Friedrich Welwitsch